The 2005 NBA playoffs was the postseason tournament of the National Basketball Association's 2004–05 season. The tournament concluded with the Western Conference champion San Antonio Spurs defeating the Eastern Conference champion Detroit Pistons 4 games to 3 in the NBA Finals. Tim Duncan was named Finals MVP.

Overview
The Chicago Bulls and Washington Wizards ended long playoff droughts in 2005, meeting each other in the first round. For the Washington Wizards, it was their first playoff appearance since 1997 (and even more ironic their opponents for that postseason appearance were the Bulls who swept them on their way to their fifth NBA title), and only their second since 1988. 
For the Chicago Bulls, it was their first post-Michael Jordan playoff appearance, as their last playoff game was Game 6 of the 1998 NBA Finals. They consistently placed at or near the bottom of the Central Division in between, but their 47–35 season in 2005 was a 24-game improvement from 2004.

The Phoenix Suns returned to the NBA playoffs after a one season absence. The Houston Rockets and the Memphis Grizzlies also entered their second consecutive postseason.

For the Los Angeles Lakers, it marked the first time in 11 seasons (dating back to 1994) and the fifth time in NBA history that they missed the playoffs. This is also the last time until 2018 that the playoffs were played entirely outside of Los Angeles.

This was the last time that the Seattle SuperSonics would be in the playoffs before they relocated to Oklahoma to become the Oklahoma City Thunder.

The Minnesota Timberwolves missed the playoffs for the first time since 1996.

For the third straight year (fifth overall) the Pacers met the Celtics in the first round. Boston won in 2003 4–2, while Indiana swept Boston in 2004. This time, Indiana won 4-3. It would be Boston's last playoff appearance until 2008.

With their first round series win over the Chicago Bulls, the Washington Wizards their first since 1982. They also won a best of seven series for the first time since 1979.

With their first round sweep of the Memphis Grizzlies, the Phoenix Suns won their first playoff series since 2000.

With their conference semifinals sweep of the Washington Wizards, the Miami Heat became the first team to go 8–0 through the first two rounds after the first round was made into a best-of-7 in the 2003 playoffs. The 2009 Cavaliers, 2010 Magic, 2012 Spurs, 2016 Cavaliers, 2017 Cavaliers and the 2017 Warriors followed suit. No team (until 2016) has made the finals after going 8–0 in the first two rounds, let alone win 12 straight games going to the NBA Finals (until the 2017 Warriors), though the Spurs came close in 2012 when they won their first 10 playoff games, then lost their next four to the Oklahoma City Thunder. In 2016, the Cleveland Cavaliers became the first team to go 8–0 through the first two rounds and make the NBA Finals.

With their conference semifinals victory over the Dallas Mavericks, the Phoenix Suns advanced to the Western Conference Finals for the first time since 1993, where they lost to the San Antonio Spurs in five games.

Game 6 of the Spurs-SuperSonics series was the last NBA Playoff game ever played at Key Arena.

With their Game 7 win over the Miami Heat, the Detroit Pistons advanced to their second consecutive NBA Finals.

The NBA Finals marked the first time since 1987 that the two previous champions met in the Finals (the Spurs won in 2003, the Pistons in 2004). 

The NBA Finals went to a Game 7 for the first time since 1994.

With their Game 7 win over the Detroit Pistons, the San Antonio Spurs won the NBA Championship. For the Spurs, it was their third title (they also won in the lockout-shortened season of 1998–99).

Format

Beginning with the 2004–05 season, with the addition of the 30th NBA franchise, the Charlotte Bobcats, the NBA realigned its divisions. Each conference now has three divisions of five teams each, and at this point in time, the winner of each division was guaranteed a top three playoff seed, regardless of whether the team had one of the top eight records in its conference. However, the division champion was not guaranteed home court advantage; a division-leading team with a poor record could be ranked number three but face a sixth seed with a better record, which would then have home court advantage. This has since been rectified by the NBA.

Playoff qualifying

Eastern Conference

Best record in conference
The Miami Heat clinched the best record in the Eastern Conference, and had home court advantage throughout the Eastern Conference playoffs.

Clinched a playoff berth
The following teams clinched a playoff berth in the East:

Miami Heat (59-23) (clinched Southeast division)
Detroit Pistons (54-28) (clinched Central division)
Boston Celtics (45-37) (clinched Atlantic division)
Chicago Bulls (47-35)
Washington Wizards (45-37)
Indiana Pacers (44-38)
Philadelphia 76ers (43-39)
New Jersey Nets (42-40)

Western Conference

Best record in NBA
The Phoenix Suns clinched the best record in the NBA, and earned home court advantage throughout the entire playoffs.  However, when Phoenix lost to the San Antonio Spurs in the Western Conference Finals, the Spurs gained home court advantage for the NBA Finals.

Clinched a playoff berth
The following teams clinched a playoff berth in the West:

Phoenix Suns (62-20) (clinched Pacific division)
San Antonio Spurs (59-23) (clinched Southwest division)
Seattle SuperSonics (52-30) (clinched Northwest division)
Dallas Mavericks (58-24)
Houston Rockets (51-31)
Sacramento Kings (50-32)
Denver Nuggets (49-33)
Memphis Grizzlies (45-37)

Bracket

First round
All times are in Eastern Daylight Time (UTC−4)

Eastern Conference first round

(1) Miami Heat vs. (8) New Jersey Nets

This was the first playoff meeting between the Nets and the Heat.

(2) Detroit Pistons vs. (7) Philadelphia 76ers

This was the third playoff meeting between these two teams, with each team winning one series apiece. The first meeting took place while the Nationals/76ers franchise were in Syracuse and the Pistons franchise were in Fort Wayne.

(3) Boston Celtics vs. (6) Indiana Pacers

This was the fifth playoff meeting between these two teams, with the Celtics winning three of the first four meetings.

(4) Chicago Bulls vs. (5) Washington Wizards

Gilbert Arenas hits the game-winning buzzer beater in Game 5.

This was the second playoff meeting between these two teams, with the Bulls winning the first meeting.

Western Conference first round

(1) Phoenix Suns vs. (8) Memphis Grizzlies

This was the first playoff meeting between the Grizzlies and the Suns.

(2) San Antonio Spurs vs. (7) Denver Nuggets

This was the fifth playoff meeting between these two teams, with the Spurs winning three of the first four meetings.

(3) Seattle SuperSonics vs. (6) Sacramento Kings

This was the second playoff meeting between these two teams, with the SuperSonics winning the first meeting.

(4) Dallas Mavericks vs. (5) Houston Rockets

This was the second playoff meeting between these two teams, with the Mavericks winning the first meeting.

Conference semifinals

Eastern Conference semifinals

(1) Miami Heat vs. (5) Washington Wizards

This was the first playoff meeting between the Heat and the Wizards.

(2) Detroit Pistons vs. (6) Indiana Pacers

Game 6 is Reggie Miller's final NBA game.

This was the third playoff meeting between these two teams, with the Pistons winning the first two meetings.

Western Conference semifinals

(1) Phoenix Suns vs. (4) Dallas Mavericks

This was the first playoff meeting between the Mavericks and the Suns.

(2) San Antonio Spurs vs. (3) Seattle SuperSonics

Tim Duncan made the series-winning shot with 0.5 seconds left in Game 6.

This was the third playoff meeting between these two teams, with the Spurs winning the first two meetings.

Conference finals

Eastern Conference finals

(1) Miami Heat vs. (2) Detroit Pistons

The Pistons beat the Heat in this series 4-3 due much to the comeback mounted in the 4th quarter of Game 7 of the Eastern Finals by Chauncey Billups. Dwyane Wade also missed Game 6 of the series due to a rib injury.

This was the second playoff meeting between these two teams, with the Heat winning the first meeting.

Western Conference finals

(1) Phoenix Suns vs. (2) San Antonio Spurs

This was the seventh playoff meeting between these two teams, with each team winning three series apiece.

NBA Finals: (W2) San Antonio Spurs vs. (E2) Detroit Pistons

All times are in Eastern Daylight Time (UTC−4)

This was the first playoff meeting between the Pistons and the Spurs.
Robert Horry hit the game-winning shot with 5.9 seconds left in Game 5.

The Finals were broadcast in the United States on ABC and in Canada on TSN. For a list of international broadcasters see the NBA international TV site.
Jennifer Lopez's "Get Right" music video became the anthem song for the playoffs and the conclusion song at the end of the regular season.

References

External links
NBA.com's section for the 2005 NBA Playoffs
NBA.com's section for the 2005 NBA Finals

National Basketball Association playoffs
Playoffs

fi:NBA-kausi 2004–2005#Pudotuspelit